Michael Curtis (28 February 1920 – 3 July 2004) was a British newspaper editor and executive.

Curtis was born in Cambridge and studied at St Lawrence College, Ramsgate and Sidney Sussex College, Cambridge. During World War II, he fought with the Duke of Wellington's Regiment.  He was injured in 1943, and after recovery, returned to Cambridge University to complete his degree.

In 1944, Curtis joined the Eastern Daily Press as a reporter, then in 1946 he joined the News Chronicle. He was promoted to become Deputy Editor in 1953, and in 1954, he became Editor. Politically, he kept the newspaper aligned with the Liberal Party, and opposed the Suez invasion, a decision which led to a significant decrease in the paper's circulation.

As Editor, Curtis proposed a succession of ideas intended to revive the paper's circulation: to start using a broadsheet format, to form a partnership with Granada Television, to merge with the Daily Herald, and finally to increase the price by a halfpenny in order to boost profits. Each idea was rejected by owner Laurence Cadbury. In 1957 Curtis finally resigned.

Curtis later worked as executive aide to the Aga Khan, writing speeches and organising publicity. In 1959, he launched the Nation Media Group on behalf of the Aga Khan, which published the Sunday Nation and subsequently the Daily Nation in Kenya, competing successfully with the existing colonial newspapers, the Tanganyika Standard and the East African Standard. Sales rose rapidly from 17,500 to 35,000, and ultimately to 165,000.  The company became profitable in ten years. As the culmination of the process of Africanising the company, Curtis stepped down in 1977, and moved to lead the Aga Khan's social welfare department in Aiglemont until his retirement in 1994.

References

1920 births
2004 deaths
Alumni of Sidney Sussex College, Cambridge
English newspaper editors
English male journalists
British newspaper executives
People educated at St Lawrence College, Ramsgate
People from Cambridge
British Army personnel of World War II
Duke of Wellington's Regiment soldiers